Pleasant Township is one of the fifteen townships of Marion County, Ohio, United States.  The 2010 census found 4,773 people in the township.

Geography
Located in the southern part of the county, it borders the following townships:
Marion Township – north
Claridon Township – northeast corner
Richland Township – east
Waldo Township – southeast
Prospect Township – southwest
Green Camp Township – west

No municipalities are located in Pleasant Township.

Name and history
It is one of fifteen Pleasant Townships statewide.

Government
The township is governed by a three-member board of trustees, who are elected in November of odd-numbered years to a four-year term beginning on the following January 1. Two are elected in the year after the presidential election and one is elected in the year before it. There is also an elected township fiscal officer, who serves a four-year term beginning on April 1 of the year after the election, which is held in November of the year before the presidential election. Vacancies in the fiscal officership or on the board of trustees are filled by the remaining trustees.

References

External links
County website

Townships in Marion County, Ohio
Townships in Ohio